Francky N'Guekam (born 29 June 1989) is a Cameroonian footballer who plays for Arras.

Club career
On 5 February 2014, N'Guekam signed a contract with Slovak side DAC 1904 Dunajská Streda. He made his debut for DAC on 1 March 2014 against Košice, entering in as a substitute in place of Matúš Turňa.

References

External links
 
 Corgoň Liga profile

1989 births
Living people
Footballers from Douala
Association football forwards
Cameroonian footballers
Cameroonian expatriate footballers
Cameroonian expatriate sportspeople in France
Cameroonian expatriate sportspeople in Slovakia
Expatriate footballers in France
Expatriate footballers in Slovakia
Championnat National 2 players
Championnat National 3 players
Slovak Super Liga players
Valenciennes FC players
AC Amiens players
Calais RUFC players
FC DAC 1904 Dunajská Streda players
Olympique Grande-Synthe players